Duodao District is a district of the city of Jingmen, Hubei, People's Republic of China.

History 
The name 'Duodao' is derived from an incident involving Guan Yu said to have occurred in the area during the Three Kingdoms period. On March 17, 2001, Hechang Township, Macheng Town, Tuanlinpu Town, Duodaoshi Subdistrict and Baimiao Subdistrict, originally part of Dongbao District, were made into Duodao District.

Administrative divisions 
Four subdistricts:
Duodaoshi/Duodao Subdistrict, Baimiao Subdistrict, Xinglong Subdistrict, Shuangxi Subdistrict

Two towns:
Tuanlinpu, Macheng

Economy 

Once an array of vegetation and fields, Duodao has developed rapidly over recent years. Apartment buildings and businesses have quickly cropped up and Duodao is soon to be home to Jingmen's first Walmart store.

Duodao is the location of Jingmen Hi-Tech Technology Industrial Park which hosts international companies such as Li Ning, which has its largest distribution centre here.

Education 

Duodao is home to some notable schools such as Duodaoshi Middle School, Jingmen Special Education School for children with special needs, The Medical School of Jingchu University of Technology, and Shilipai Primary School

References

County-level divisions of Hubei
Jingmen